"Secrets" is a 1996 song by British R&B girl group Eternal. It was written by songwriter Debra Killings, and was the fifth and final single from their second album, Power of a Woman. The song peaked at number nine on the UK Singles Chart, becoming the group's ninth top-10 entry on the UK Singles Chart.

Critical reception
A reviewer from Music Week rated the song three out of five, describing it as a "smooth, funky number [that] should follow the trio's last three singles into the Top 10."

Track listings

Note: The two live tracks were recorded live at the Manchester Apollo by the Radio One Live Music Unit.

Charts

References

1996 singles
1996 songs
Eternal (band) songs
EMI Records singles
First Avenue Records singles